Gornji Stajevac is a village in the municipality of Trgovište, in southeastern Serbia. According to the 2002 census, the village has a population of 160 people. Čakr-paša, one of the most notable hajduks in the 19th century, was born in the village.

References

Populated places in Pčinja District